Ryomyong Sports Club is an association football club based in P'yŏngyang, North Korea, they play in a red home kit. Ryomyong means light of the dawn in Korean language.

History 
Ryomyong reached the 2017 Hwaebul Cup final, ultimately losing to Sobaeksu

Continental

Achievements

Domestic
DPR Korea Premier Football League: 1
Runners-up: 2017–18

Hwaebul Cup: 1
Runners-up: 2017

Man'gyŏngdae Prize: 1
Third place: 2016

References

Football clubs in North Korea
Football clubs in Pyongyang
Military association football clubs in North Korea